The 2017 FINA Men's Water Polo World League is the 16th edition of the annual men's international water polo tournament. It was played between November 2016 and June 2017 and opened to all men's water polo national teams. After participating in a preliminary round, eight teams qualify to play in a final tournament, called the Super Final from 20–25 June 2017.

In the world league, there are specific rules that do not allow matches to end in a draw.  If teams are level at the end of the 4th quarter of any world league match, the match will be decided by a penalty shootout. Teams earn points in the standings in group matches as follows:

 Match won in normal time - 3 points
 Match won in shootout - 2 points
 Match lost in shootout - 1 point
 Match lost in normal time - 0 points

Europe

Preliminary round
The European preliminary round consisted of two groups of four teams and a third group of three teams. The winner of each group after the home and away series of games qualified for the Super Final.

Group A

Group B

Group C

Intercontinental Water Polo Tournament
April 25–30, 2017 Gold Coast Aquatic Centre, Gold Coast, Queensland, Australia

Group stage

Final stage

5th Place

3rd Place

Final

Super Final
June 20–25, 2017 Ruza, Ruzsky District, Moscow Oblast, Russia
In the Super Final the eight qualifying teams are split into two groups of four teams with all teams progressing to the knock-out stage.

Qualified teams

Group A

Group B

Knockout stage

5th–8th Places

Quarterfinals

5th–8th Places Semifinals

Semifinals

7th Place

5th Place

3rd Place

Final

Final ranking

Awards

References

 Rules & Regulations

World League, men
FINA Water Polo World League
2017 in Russian sport
International water polo competitions hosted by Russia